The Greenlandic Men's Handball Championship is a handball tournament to determine the National Champion from Greenland.

Results

Places from 1974 until 2004:

References

 
1974 establishments in Greenland